Strongylosoma nietneri, (also known as Polydesmus nietneri), is a species of millipedes in the family Paradoxosomatidae. It is endemic to Sri Lanka

References

Polydesmida
Millipedes of Asia
Endemic fauna of Sri Lanka
Animals described in 1864